Seamus McSporran, BEM (born 1938) is a Scottish man who worked in over 13 jobs for 31 years in the Scottish  Isle of Gigha. The island has a population of about 150.

For 31 years McSporran was working in 14 jobs:

 ambulance, bus and taxi driver (all the same vehicle)
 School-bus driver
 A boatman
 An accountant
 bed and breakfast hotel keeper (including renting bicycles to tourists)
 fire chief
 insurance agent
 petrol pump attendant
 pier master
 police officer
 postmaster
 registrar of births, marriages and deaths
 rent collector
 shopkeeper
 undertaker
 Barman
 He also used to deliver the beer to the island's local pub

McSporran began in 1965 as postmaster and shopkeeper and gradually increased his responsibilities. In 1989 he received the British Empire Medal for his services.

McSporran announced his retirement in April 2000 at the age of 62. In an interview he said that his wife had been a great help with his multiple duties. His brother is Willie McSporran.

McSporran was featured in the widely used English textbooks for adults New Headway Elementary and New Headway Elementary 3rd Edition.

References

 BBC: Man of many jobs retires
 ABC: Scotland's Hardest-working man retires

1938 births
Officers in Scottish police forces
Living people
People from Argyll and Bute
Recipients of the British Empire Medal
Scottish police officers
Isle of Gigha
Fire chiefs